The 2023 Concordia Eagles men's volleyball team represents Concordia University Irvine in the 2023 NCAA Division I & II men's volleyball season. The Eagles, led by second year head coach Riley Salmon, play their home games at CU Arena. The Eagles are members of the MPSF and were picked to finish seventh in the MPSF preseason poll.

Roster

Schedule
TV/Internet Streaming information:
All home games will be streamed on EagleEye streaming page, powered by Stretch Internet. Most road games will also be streamed by the schools streaming service. The conference tournament will be streamed by FloVolleyball.

 *-Indicates conference match.
 Times listed are Pacific Time Zone.

Announcers for televised games

Keyano: Jon O'Neill
Vanguard: Jeff Runyan
Princeton: Jeff Runyan
Menlo: Jeff Runyan
UC Irvine: Robbie Loya & Charlie Brande 
UC Irvine: Jeff Runyan
Loyola Chicago: 
Benedictine Mesa: 
Master's: 
Hawai'i: 
Hawai'i: 
UC San Diego: 
BYU: 
BYU: 
UCLA: 
UCLA: 
Penn State: 
Daemen: 
Grand Canyon: 
Grand Canyon: 
Stanford: 
Stanford: 
Pepperdine: 
Pepperdine: 
USC: 
USC:
MPSF Quarterfinal:

References

2023 in sports in California
2023 NCAA Division I & II men's volleyball season
Concordia Irvine